
The following lists events that happened during 1836 in South Africa.

Events
 The 6th Cape Frontier War ends.
 The Cape Colony's Legislative Council provides for elected municipal councils.
 Voortrekkers under Andries Potgieter defeat the Ndebele at the Battle of Vegkop.
c. 10,000 Afrikaner cattle ranchers and farmers make Great Trek.

Births
 4 October - Pieter Arnoldus Cronjé, Boer General, is born near Colesberg, Cape Colony

References
See Years in South Africa for list of References

 
South Africa
Years in South Africa